The Kennaway Fine Art Guild is an association of artists from the South West of England. Located in Sidmouth at the Kennaway House, it was founded in Spring 2009 and held its inaugural exhibition on 3 October that same year.

References

External links

 Official website

Arts organisations based in the United Kingdom
Sidmouth